The National Press Club is an association of primarily news journalists, but also includes academics, business people and members of the public service, and is based in Canberra, Australia.

History

The National Press Club was founded in 1963 as the National Press Luncheon Club by a few journalists with the backing of the Canberra Press Gallery.  The founding president was Tony Eggleton.

It was renamed the National Press Club in 1968, and established official premises in 1976.

Since its inception, the club's reputation has steadily grown, attracting parliamentarians, scientists, diplomats, sporting personalities and other prominent figures to address its weekly luncheons. Guests have included heads of government and ministers of Australia and other countries, including Richard Nixon, Margaret Thatcher and Indira Gandhi.

Activities and format
, the National Press Club address is a weekly formal speech of approximately one hour, which includes time for questions from members of the press. The president introduces the speaker and moderates the questions. The addresses are broadcast on the ABC Network at 12:30 pm.

2007 federal election leaders' debate controversy 
On 21 October 2007 a debate between Prime Minister John Howard and Opposition Leader Kevin Rudd was hosted by the National Press Club from the Great Hall of Parliament in Canberra.  The debate was televised live by the Australian Broadcasting Corporation, Channel Nine and Sky News.  A controversial decision was taken during the debate to interrupt the provision of the live transmission signal to the Channel Nine network because of the inclusion by Channel Nine within its broadcast picture of a real-time line chart of the aggregate studio audience reaction to the debate.
This type of chart is referred to as the 'Worm', after the form in which it is rendered and an approximately 'worm-like' movement of the display within the area of the screen in which it appears.  The decision by the National Press Club to interrupt the provision of the live transmission signal to the Channel Nine network has been heavily criticised as contrary to the principles of free speech that are a part of the journalistic tradition.
On 22 October 2007, Greens Senator Bob Brown called for a Senate inquiry into the circumstances in which the transmission signal had been cut.

References

External links
 Official website

Mass media in Australia
Politics of Australia
1963 establishments in Australia
Organizations established in 1963
Press clubs
Clubs and societies in Australia